Louis-Frédéric Schützenberger (Strasbourg September 8, 1825, Strasbourg April 17, 1903) was a German-French painter.

Biography 

Schützenberger was born in an Alsatian family of famous brewers in Strasbourg. He was a student of Paul Delaroche and Marc-Charles-Gabriel Gleyre at École nationale supérieure des Beaux-Arts. Chevalier French Legion of Honor since 1870.

In a period between 1870 and 1885 he was the owner of the Scharrachbergheim-Irmstett castle, where he had made his studio on the first floor.

The artist René Schützenberger was his first cousin once removed.

Works 

Chasseur sonnant du cor ou L'Hallali, 1859, Museum of Fine Arts of Strasbourg
Portrait d'homme, Museum of Fine Arts of Strasbourg
Terpsichore, c. 1861, Paris, Musée d'Orsay
Centaures chassant le sanglier, 1864, Paris, Musée d'Orsay
L'Enlèvement d'europe, 1865, huile sur toile, 146x223, Musée des beaux-arts d'Arras
Portrait de Mélanie Schützenberger, tante de l'artiste, 1865, Museum of Fine Arts of Strasbourg
Portrait de Th. Berger, Museum of Fine Arts of Strasbourg
Entrevue de César et d'Arioviste en Alsace, Musée des beaux-arts de Mulhouse
Le Soir, Musée des beaux arts de Mulhouse
L'Exode (famille alsacienne quittant son pays), 1872, Musée des beaux arts de Mulhouse
Portrait de Mme Parot, 1875, Museum of Fine Arts of Strasbourg
Portrait de Louis Schützenberger Père, brasseur à Schiltigheim, 1876, Musée historique de Strasbourg
Portrait de Mme Weber-Schlumberger, 1881, Museum of Fine Arts of Strasbourg
Portrait du baron Maximilien Frédéric Albert De Dietrich, 1882, private collection
Scène d'inquisition, 1889, private collection
Portrait d'homme, 1897, Museum of Fine Arts of Strasbourg
Portrait de femme, 1900, private collection
Portrait du gouverneur Louis-Gustave Binger, 1900, Musée d'art et d'histoire Louis Senlecq
Portrait de femme, Museum of Fine Arts of Strasbourg
Souvenir d'Italie - Fuite en Égypte, Musée des beaux arts de Mulhouse
Femme nue, début du xxe siècle, Strasbourg Museum of Modern and Contemporary Art

References 

Nouveau dictionnaire de biographie alsacienne, article de Raymond Oberlé, vol. 34, p. 3564

External links 
Shutzenberger, Louis Biographies alsaciennes avec portraits en photographie. Série 3 
Louis Frédéric Schützenberger - Culture.fr
Master Paintings of the World
L'Art en Alsace-Lorraine, par René Ménard, 1876, p.193
Notice des peintures, sculptures et dessins de l'École moderne, Musée National du Luxembourg, 1886.

Family genealogy Schützenberger
Awards
Le Monde artiste, necrologue, 1903
Guide dans l'exposition universelle de 1855
Mention honorable au  l'exposition universelle de 1900
Bacchante, L.Schutzenberger

1825 births
1903 deaths
19th-century French painters
French male painters
French Realist painters
Academic art
Chevaliers of the Légion d'honneur
École des Beaux-Arts alumni
French people of German descent
Artists from Strasbourg
Painters from Alsace
19th-century French male artists